Wilfried Van Herck (born 16 April 1946) is a Belgian rower. He competed in the men's coxed pair event at the 1972 Summer Olympics.

References

1946 births
Living people
Belgian male rowers
Olympic rowers of Belgium
Rowers at the 1972 Summer Olympics
Sportspeople from Antwerp